Portnaguran is a settlement situated within Point, on the Isle of Lewis, in the Outer Hebrides, Scotland. Portnaguran is the township at the north-easternmost point of the peninsula. Portnaguran is situated at the north-eastern end of the A866, within the parish of Stornoway.

There is a small pier in the harbour, and the surrounding villages are Portvoller, Broker, Aird and Flesherin.

References

External links

Canmore - Rambler: Port Nan Giuran, Lewis, North Minch site record
Ports and Harbours of the UK - Portnaguran

Villages in the Isle of Lewis